Takayuki Kobayashi (小林 鷹之, Kobayashi Takayuki, born 29 November 1974) is a Japanese politician who served in the Kishida Cabinet as Minister for Economic Security from 2021 to 2022.

Life and career 
Kobayashi was born in Ichikawa, Chiba and educated at Kaisei Academy. He attended the University of Tokyo and got bachelor's degree from the Faculty of Law in 1999. While at the University of Tokyo, he was captain of the Rowing Club. He received a M.P.P. degree from the Harvard Kennedy School in 2001.

He joined the Ministry of Finance in 1999 and worked in the Financial Bureau (:ja:理財局), whose main task was to manage government bonds, fiscal investment and loans, and state property. Keizo Hamada, the governor of Kagawa Prefecture, was Kobayashi's boss at the Bureau.

From 2007 to 2010, he worked as a diplomat at the Embassy of Japan in Washington, D.C.

Political career

Election 
In June 2010, he became the head of the Chiba Prefecture Second Constituency branch of the Liberal Democratic Party, and in December 2012, he was first elected to the House of Representatives in the 46th General Election for the House of Representatives, running for the Chiba Second Constituency on the Liberal Democratic Party's official ticket and the New Komeito Party's nomination.

Abe Cabinet 
On 5 August 2016, he was appointed Parliamentary Vice-Minister for Defence in Abe Cabinet, and stepped down on 3 August 2017.

He was elected to the House of Representatives in the 48th general election in 2017.

Kishida Cabinet 
In the 2021 LDP leadership election, he endorsed Sanae Takaichi. In the run-off election, he supported Fumio Kishida.

He was appointed to the Kishida Cabinet as Minister for Economic security on 4 October 2021.

On 10 August 2022, Kobayashi was dismissed from the Second Kishida Cabinet because of ties to the Unification Church. His dismissal was part of a wider purge by the Kishida administration following the assassination of Shinzo Abe and increasing media scrutiny of LDP officials' close ties with the church.

References 

Living people
1974 births
21st-century Japanese politicians
Liberal Democratic Party (Japan) politicians
Ministers of Finance of Japan
Harvard University alumni
Japanese bankers